Lorentz Eichstadt (10 August 1596 – 8 June 1660) was a German mathematician and astronomer.  He was a doctor of medicine in Szczecin in Pomerania and taught medicine and mathematics in Danzig.

The lunar crater Eichstadt is named after him.

References

External links
Lunar Republic: Craters. Retrieved October 8, 2005.

1596 births
1660 deaths
17th-century German mathematicians
17th-century German astronomers
17th-century German physicians
Scientists from Gdańsk